Lukhanyo Am (born 28 November 1993) is a South African professional rugby union player for the South Africa national team and the  in the United Rugby Championship. His regular positions are centre and wing.

Professional career

Am played for the Margate-based Gladiators Rugby Academy before he was called into the  Under-19 squad that won the 2012 Under-19 Provincial Championship Division B and winning promotion to Division A, making six appearances and scoring three tries.

After spending time with Saracens during the off-season as part of an exchange programme in conjunction with the British High Commission, he returned to be included in the Border Bulldogs senior squad for the 2013 Vodacom Cup competition and made his senior debut against defending champions  in Paarl.

Southern Kings
At the start of 2016, Am was one of two Sharks players that joined the ' Super Rugby squad for a trial period as they prepared for the 2016 Super Rugby season.

Sharks
After a successful spell at Southern Kings there were high expectations that Am had to meet. He did not disappoint and played a crucial part for the Sharks, helping them reach the quarter finals of the 2017, 2018 and 2019 Super Rugby seasons. In January 2020, Am was named captain of the Sharks for the 2020 Super Rugby season, replacing the retiring Tendai Mtawarira.

International career
In 2013, Am was named in a South African Barbarians team to face Saracens in London.

South Africa 'A'
In 2016, Am was included in a South Africa 'A' squad that played a two-match series against a touring England Saxons team. He came on as a replacement in their first match in Bloemfontein, but ended on the losing side as the visitors ran out 32–24 winners. He was promoted to the starting line-up for the second match of the series, a 26–29 defeat to the Saxons in George. Am was named as captain of South Africa 'A' for the game against the British and Irish Lions on July 14, 2021.

South Africa
Am was included in the South African squad for the 2017 end-of-year rugby union internationals.
Am was named in South Africa's squad for the 2019 Rugby World Cup. South Africa won the tournament, defeating England in the final.
Am played a central role in the Springboks' campaign, featuring in six out of seven matches. He assisted South Africa's first try in a Rugby World Cup final.

Test Match Record

Pld = Games Played, W = Games Won, D = Games Drawn, L = Games Lost, Tri = Tries Scored, Pts = Points Scored

International tries 
As of 14 August 2022

References

External links
 

South African rugby union players
Living people
1993 births
Border Bulldogs players
Sportspeople from Qonce
Southern Kings players
South Africa international rugby union players
Rugby union centres
Falcons (rugby union) players
Sharks (Currie Cup) players
Sharks (rugby union) players
Kobelco Kobe Steelers players
Rugby union players from the Eastern Cape